Greater Manchester Metro Limited (GMML) was a private company formed by the GMA consortium (GEC Alsthom, John Mowlem and AMEC) in 1989 to design, build and operate the Metrolink light rail system in Greater Manchester, England. Construction of the Metrolink system began in March 1990.

The contract was awarded for 15 years subject to early termination should the network be extended. In 1997 contracts for extension was let to Altram (Manchester), a consortium of Ansaldo Transporti, Serco, Laing Civil Engineering and 3i. Serco Metrolink, a wholly owned subsidiary of Serco Limited, took over the operations and maintenance of the system on 26 May 1997. In March 2003, Serco bought out its partners and Altram (Manchester) Limited became a wholly owned subsidiary of Serco.

In July 2007 the contract to operate Metrolink was awarded to Stagecoach. Unlike Serco,  Stagecoach did not own the concession, merely operated it on a fixed-term management contract. Stagecoach later sold the contract to the RATP Group.

References

Companies based in Manchester
John Laing Group
Manchester Metrolink
Post-privatisation British railway companies
3i Group companies
1989 establishments in England
1997 disestablishments in England
British companies established in 1989